Richard Alan Scheinblum (November 5, 1942 – May 10, 2021), nicknamed "Shane", was an American professional Major League Baseball (MLB) player.

In 1971, he won the American Association Most Valuable Player Award after hitting a league-leading and Triple-A-record .388.  In 1972 he was named to the American League All-Star team, and batted .300.  He played for the Cleveland Indians, Washington Senators, Kansas City Royals, Cincinnati Reds, California Angels, and St. Louis Cardinals. He also played two seasons in Japan for the Hiroshima Toyo Carp.

Early life
Scheinblum was Jewish, and was born in Hell's Kitchen in Manhattan, New York City to Fred and Lee (born in Ukraine; died in 1949) Scheinblum, and grew up in Fort Apache in the South Bronx in New York City. He was very proud that he was one of only (as he recalled it) six Jewish major leaguers at the time, along with Art Shamsky, Mike Epstein, Steve Stone, Ron Blomberg, and Ken Holtzman. His father remarried and the family moved to Englewood, New Jersey, when he was 10 years old. He attended Dwight Morrow High School in Englewood, where he played basketball and soccer, in addition to baseball.

He was a 1964 graduate of C.W. Post College, now known as LIU Post, with a degree in Business Administration. There, he was a three-sport athlete, competing in baseball, basketball, and track and field. In baseball he batted .415 in 1964, and set the C.W. Post records in career triples (12) and batting average (.395).  He was inducted in the college's sports Hall of Fame in 2005.

Baseball career
In 1964 he played for the Burlington Indians and hit .309 (9th in the Carolina League), in 1965 he played for the Salinas Indians and hit .318 (9th in the league) with a .460 slugging percentage (8th in the league) and had 21 doubles (9th in the league), and in 1965 he played for the Pawtucket Indians and hit .263. He made his major league debut with the Cleveland Indians in 1967, and hit .318, as during the rest of the season he played for the Portland Beavers and hit .291 with 77 runs (5th in the league), 25 doubles (7th in the league), and 16 home runs (8th in the league). 

During the 1966–67 offseason, Scheinblum played in the Nicaraguan Professional Baseball League and led his team to a championship on January 22, 1967. After the game, however, he and teammate Jim Weaver hid under the bed in Scheinblum's hotel room while bullets flew and the Nicaraguan National Guard killed between dozens and hundreds of anti-government demonstrators near the hotel room.

In 1968 he played again for Portland, and hit .304 (9th in the league) with a .479 slugging percentage and 75 RBIs (7th in the league), but in 55 at bats batted .218 for Cleveland, followed by .186 in limited action the following year. In 1970 he batted .337 (5th in the league)/.424 (leading the league)/.576 (second in the league to Cesar Cedeno) for the Class AAA Wichita Aeros, leading the league in runs scored (79), hits (155), and RBIs (84), and second in the league in doubles (32), home runs (24), walks (72), and sacrifice flies (6).

Playing for the Denver Bears in 1971, he won the American Association Most Valuable Player Award after he hit a league-leading and Triple-A-record .388 with a league-leading .490 on-base percentage, 83 runs (third in the league), .725 slugging percentage (leading the league), 145 hits (third in the league), 31 doubles (tied for the league lead), 10 triples (leading the league), 25 home runs (second in the league), and 108 RBIs.

Scheinblum played outfield in the major leagues from 1965 to 1974. He was a switch-hitter.

His best year was 1972, when he hit .300 (sixth in the American League) with an on-base percentage of .383 (fifth in the league), 8 homers, and 66 RBIs for the Royals.  He was named to the American League All-Star team, and was the Royals' Player of the Month in August.  Following the Munich massacre in September of that year, Scheinblum wore a black armband in memory of the slain Israeli athletes. He later said, "I wore the emblematic black band ... not only because they were Jewish athletes, but because they were human beings".

Scheinblum was traded along with Roger Nelson to the Cincinnati Reds for Hal McRae and Wayne Simpson on December 1, 1972. He batted .307 with a .402 on base percentage in 1973; after a slow start for the Cincinnati Reds, he was traded to the California Angels, for whom he batted .328 with an on base percentage of .418.

He hit .263 with 13 homers and 127 RBIs in his career.

In 1976, after leaving Major League Baseball, he played for Japan's Hiroshima Toyo Carp in 1976, batting .307 (8th in the Japan Central League) with a slugging percentage of .501 and 20 home runs.

Retirement 
After his career, ended he went on to live in Palm Harbor, Florida. , he was working as a salesman with a promotional products company. He died May 10, 2021, after a long illness.

Family
His son, Monte Scheinblum, hit a golf ball 329 yards, 13 inches, into a 20 mile-per-hour wind to win the 1992 U.S. National Long Driving Championship, and was also the world long driving champion that year.

See also
List of select Jewish baseball players

References

External links

Baseball Gauge
Venezuelan Professional Baseball League
 Press release about his being named to the Long Island University C. W. Post Campus Athletic Hall of Fame

1942 births
2021 deaths
American Association (1902–1997) MVP Award winners
American expatriate baseball players in Japan
Burlington Indians players (1958–1964)
California Angels players
Cincinnati Reds players
Cleveland Indians players
Denver Bears players
Dwight Morrow High School alumni
Hiroshima Toyo Carp players
Jewish American baseball players
Jewish Major League Baseball players
Kansas City Royals players
Leones del Caracas players
American expatriate baseball players in Venezuela
LIU Post alumni
Major League Baseball outfielders
Pawtucket Indians players
Portland Beavers players
Salinas Indians players
St. Louis Cardinals players
Baseball players from New York City
Tulsa Oilers (baseball) players
Washington Senators (1961–1971) players
People from Hell's Kitchen, Manhattan
People from the Bronx
American expatriate baseball players in Nicaragua